Mario Luis Bautista Maulión (4 December 1934 – 27 September 2020) was an Argentinian Roman Catholic archbishop.

Maulión was born in Argentina and was ordained to the priesthood in 1960. He served as titular bishop of Febiana and was auxiliary bishop of the Roman Catholic Diocese of Rosario, Argentina, from 1988 to 1995 and as bishop of the Roman Catholic Diocese of San Nicolás de los Arroyos, Argentina, from 1995 to 2003. He served as archbishop of the Roman Catholic Archdiocese of Paraná, Argentina, from 1995 to 2010.

Notes

1934 births
2020 deaths
20th-century Roman Catholic archbishops in Argentina
21st-century Roman Catholic archbishops in Argentina
Roman Catholic archbishops of Paraná
Roman Catholic bishops of Rosario
Roman Catholic bishops of San Nicolás de los Arroyos